George Wood Guyan (3 April 1901–1984) was a Scottish footballer who played in the Football League for Exeter City, Hull City, South Shields and Swindon Town.

References

1901 births
1984 deaths
English footballers
Association football forwards
English Football League players
Banks O' Dee F.C. players
Dundee F.C. players
Gateshead A.F.C. players
Hull City A.F.C. players
Connah's Quay & Shotton F.C. players
Swindon Town F.C. players
Exeter City F.C. players
Rochdale A.F.C. players
Bath City F.C. players
Drumcondra F.C. players
Hebburn Town F.C. players